The 1991 Japanese Grand Prix (formally the XVII Fuji Television Japanese Grand Prix) was a Formula One motor race held at Suzuka on 20 October 1991. It was the fifteenth round of the 1991 Formula One season. The 53-lap race was won by McLaren driver Gerhard Berger after he started from pole position. His teammate Ayrton Senna finished second and Riccardo Patrese was third for the Williams team.  The race would mark Mclaren's last one-two finish for six years until the 1997 European Grand Prix.

Pre-race
Formula One moved to Japan with the fight for the title still open; this was the fifth year in a row that the title would be decided at the Suzuka circuit. Both championship contenders Ayrton Senna and Nigel Mansell knew exactly what they needed to do; Mansell had to win with help and Senna needed to beat Mansell. There were several changes to the driver lineup, the most notable being at Leyton House where Ivan Capelli had been replaced by young Austrian Karl Wendlinger, with Capelli being freed up as a spare driver for Ferrari if Alain Prost decided not to enter. It was the first time the Leyton House/March team had not entered with Capelli as a named driver since their return to the grid in 1987, during which time he had partnered Mauricio Gugelmin in every race from 1988 onwards. Elsewhere, AGS had run out of money and did not make the voyage to Japan, while fellow stragglers Coloni had hired local driver Naoki Hattori. Johnny Herbert was back behind the wheel of the Lotus after having missed a few races in the second half of the season due to Japanese Formula 3000 commitments.

Qualifying

Pre-qualifying report
With the withdrawal of AGS from Formula One prior to this event, and the return of the Coloni team after missing the last grand Prix, the pre-qualifying pool was reduced to six cars.

A Brabham topped the time sheets for the seventh time this season as Martin Brundle was fastest, over a second ahead of Alex Caffi in the Footwork. It was only the second time in seven attempts that the Italian had pre-qualified. His team-mate Michele Alboreto was third fastest, just under a tenth of a second slower. The fourth and final pre-qualifying position went to Gabriele Tarquini for Fondmetal, the second time in as many attempts that he had pre-qualified for his new team.

For the first time in 1991, the other Brabham failed to pre-qualify, as Mark Blundell suffered an oil leak in his Yamaha engine during the session. His time was only good enough for fifth place. Coloni had hired the 1990 Japanese Formula Three champion, Naoki Hattori, to replace Pedro Chaves for the last two races of the season, but the car broke down before Hattori was able to post a representative time.

Pre-qualifying classification

Qualifying report
There were a number of accidents during the qualifying sessions, including young sensation Michael Schumacher and Ferrari driver Jean Alesi. The biggest of these accidents was the one that befell Éric Bernard who broke his ankle and would not take any further part in the race. At the end of the qualifying sessions it was a McLaren front row with Gerhard Berger ahead of Ayrton Senna.  Mansell was third followed by the unhappy Alain Prost, Riccardo Patrese, Jean Alesi, Pierluigi Martini, Gianni Morbidelli, Michael Schumacher, and Nelson Piquet. Senna was right where he wanted to be, while Mansell knew he had his work cut out for him.

Qualifying classification

Race

Race report
At the start of the race Berger got away well and Senna blocked Mansell the way that Mansell had done to him in Portugal.  Elsewhere Jean Alesi's day ended on the first lap in a cloud of smoke, his Ferrari engine having blown. At the end of lap 1 the order was Berger, Senna, Mansell, Patrese, and Prost. There was a huge accident on lap two when Andrea de Cesaris spun his Jordan while leading other cars, and the resulting accident took Wendlinger, Pirro, and Lehto with him. At the front Berger pulled off into the lead while Mansell hounded Senna. It all ended on lap 10 when Mansell made a mistake on the first corner and spun off. His Williams was stuck in the gravel and Mansell was out of championship contention.

With the news of Mansell's retirement, Senna and Berger both went off into the distance, with Berger waving his recrowned world champion teammate through. The two ran in formation for the rest of the race with Senna letting Berger through on the last lap to win his first race for McLaren.

Patrese finished third followed by Prost, Martin Brundle scoring the last points in the history of the Brabham team, and Stefano Modena in the Tyrrell. Senna had won his third world championship.

This was the last time Senna, Prost, Piquet and Mansell raced together; Prost was dismissed by Ferrari before the final race of the season, which turned out to be Piquet's last.

Race classification

Championship standings after the race
 Bold text indicates who still has a theoretical chance of becoming World Champion.

Drivers'  Championship standings

Constructors'   Championship standings

 Note: Only the top five positions are included for both sets of  standings.

References

 
 

Japanese Grand Prix
Japanese Grand Prix
Grand Prix